Alexander Penelas (born December 18, 1961) is an American attorney who is the former mayor of Miami-Dade County, Florida.

Education and personal life
Penelas, an American of Cuban descent, attended St. Thomas University and graduated in 1981 with a degree in political science. In 1985, he received his J.D. degree from the University of Miami School of Law, where he graduated cum laude and was inducted into the university's Iron Arrow Honor Society.

Penelas and his wife, Lilliam, have two adult sons, William and Christopher, and a younger daughter, Alexandra.

Political life

Alex Penelas served on the city council of Hialeah, Florida from 1987 to 1990. In 1990, he was elected to serve as a county commissioner in Dade County.

Miami-Dade Mayor
Penelas ran in 1996 for Mayor of Dade County, renamed Miami-Dade County in 1997. Penelas advanced to the runoff for Mayor against fellow Commissoner Arthur Teele. Penelas scored 37% to Teele's 25% with former mayor of Miami Maurice Ferre and Xavier Suarez in third and fourth. In the run-off Penelas soundly beat Teele with 60.56% to Teele's 39.44%. Penelas ran for reelection in 2000 and beat Miami Dade Commissioner Miguel Diaz de la Portilla with 51.6% to Diaz de la Portilla's 20.9%. Because Penelas reached the 50% threshold, a runoff was not needed.

As mayor, he vocally opposed the repatriation of Elián González in 2000, but was not successful in stopping the repatriation.

2004 Senate campaign

In 2004, Penelas was term-limited as mayor and ran for 2004 United States Senate election in Florida. This was the first open Senate seat since 1980, it was being vacated by longtime incumbent and Dade County native Bob Graham. Penelas finished third in the primary, behind Betty Castor and Peter Deutsch. His campaign was made more difficult when Al Gore called him "the single most treacherous and dishonest person I dealt with during the 2000 presidential election campaign anywhere in America."

2020 mayoral bid 

In April 2019, Penelas announced his campaign for re-election to the office of Miami-Dade County Mayor, a position he previously occupied for eight years. Penelas initially led in most polls but finished in third in the first round behind Daniella Levine Cava and Esteban Bovo.

References

External links
"Alex Penelas Contronts a Tough Critic: His Own Party", St. Petersburg Times, August 31, 2003.
"Alex Penelas, former Miami-Dade Mayor, to Provide Political Commentary and Analysis for Univision", Univision statement, December 17, 2004.
"Al Politics Is Loco", The American Spectator, June 8, 2004.
Alex Penelas at University of Miami Famous Alumni.

1961 births
Living people
American politicians of Cuban descent
Florida Democrats
Mayors of Miami-Dade County, Florida
Politicians from Miami
St. Thomas University (Florida) alumni
University of Miami School of Law alumni
Florida city council members
Television personalities from Florida